Lagerstroemia anisoptera is a species of plant in the family Lythraceae. It is a tree endemic to Peninsular Malaysia. It is threatened by habitat loss.

References

anisoptera
Endemic flora of Peninsular Malaysia
Trees of Peninsular Malaysia
Vulnerable flora of Asia
Taxonomy articles created by Polbot